The Hillman Prize is a journalism award given out annually by The Sidney Hillman Foundation, named for noted American labor leader Sidney Hillman. It is given to "journalists, writers and public figures who pursue social justice and public policy for the common good."

Murray Kempton was the first recipient, in 1950. Organizations have also received the award. Each winner receives $5,000.

Recipients

References

External links

American journalism awards
Awards established in 1950
1950 establishments in the United States